Dong District (Dong-gu) is a ward in Incheon, South Korea.

city information
The city area is developed on a hill with an elevation of 30-40 m above sea level, and the reclaimed land on the north coast is formed as a seashore industrial complex, forming a part of the Incheon seashore industrial zone and connected to the Juan and Bupyeong industrial complexes. Although the population is evenly distributed throughout the district, the entire district is an old residential area connected to the old town of Incheon, and the population is decreasing every year. Arterial roads extend in all directions with the Songnim-dong roundabout as the center, and branch roads have irregular shapes due to topographical constraints. The entire district forms a residential area adjacent to the city center and the northern reclaimed land is developed as an industrial area, so it has the highest population density among the four districts of Incheon.

An autonomous district located in the midwest of Incheon Metropolitan City. It has the smallest population among the eight districts of Incheon Metropolitan City and the smallest area among the ten districts. Geographically, it borders Jung-gu to the south, Seo-gu to the north, Michuhol-gu to the east, and the Yellow Sea to the west. Although it is located to the west of Incheon, the name Dong-gu was given because it was an area to the east of Incheon City Hall (now Jung-gu Office) in Songhak-dong, Jung-gu.

Administrative Divisions of Incheon Dong-gu

Manseok-dong
Hwasu 1-Hwapyeong Dong
Hwasu 2-dong
Songhyeon 1 to 3 Dong
Songnim 1 to 6 Dong
Geumchang-dong (combination of Geumgok-dong and Changyeong-dong)

Education 
JEI University

References

External links
 Official Homepage 
 Incheon Metropolitan City Dong-gu Office
 원당 베네하임 더힐

 
Districts of Incheon